"Look of Love" is a song written by Ellie Greenwich and Jeff Barry, which was a 1964 Top 40 hit for Lesley Gore.  The song was one in a long line of successful "Brill Building Sound" hits created by composers and arrangers working in New York City's Brill Building at 1619 Broadway.  Pop songwriting stars Barry and Greenwich had previously scored hits with songs such as "Be My Baby" and "Baby, I Love You" (The Ronettes), and "Then He Kissed Me" and "Da Doo Ron Ron" (The Crystals).
In the US, "Look of Love" peaked at #27 on the Billboard charts.

Background
The most commercially successful solo singer to be identified with the girl group sound, Lesley Gore hit the number one spot with her first release, "It's My Party," in 1963.  "Look of Love" was produced by Quincy Jones, who amped up the teenager's sound with double-tracked vocals and intricate backup vocals and horns.  "Irresistibly melodic... it remains a classic archetype of female adolescent yearning."  Billboard said of the song that it is "in the vein of [Gore's] early hits," predicting that it "will he a fast chart climber."  Cash Box described it as "a most attractive multi-voiced reading of a handclappin' jump'er that's sure to make the teeners sit up and take notice real quick" with a "standout Claus Ogerman arrangement."

Chart performance

Cover versions
The song has been covered by other artists, notably Pattie D'Arcy, Ellie Greenwich, and The Copycats.

References

1964 singles
Songs written by Ellie Greenwich
Songs written by Jeff Barry
Lesley Gore songs
Song recordings produced by Quincy Jones
Brill Building songs
1964 songs
Mercury Records singles